Morro Solar (morro in Spanish means: a rounded promontory) is a headland, situated in the district of Chorrillos, to the south of Lima, Peru. Morro Solar is notable for being a site of the Battle of San Juan and Chorrillos between Peruvian and Chilean forces in 1881. Notable landmarks include an astronomical observatory and a monument to an unknown soldier. Its geological formations are rich in silver which is being extracted by several mining companies.

Geography

Alexander George Findlay described it as "a remarkable cluster of hills, standing on a sandy plain; when seen from the southward it has the appearance of an island in the shape of a quoin, sloping to the westward, and falling very abruptly in-shore; on its sea face, however, it terminates in a steep cliff, with a sandy bay on each side." The sandy shore between Morro Solar and Lurin is known as Conchan Beach. Its sea face terminates in a steep cliff at Codo Point with a sandy bay on each side. The northern side of Morro Solar is the Chorillos Bay which was used in the 1860s for anchoring of ships only in exceptional circumstances as the bottom of the sea consisted of hard sand, clay stones and boulders, which was upsetting the stability of the ships. The summit of the hill range provides scenic views of the Bay of Lima, the city of Lima and South Spas.

Geology

The Morro Solar is part of the very strange topography of Lima which evolved as a result of geological readjustments. It resulted from high sea winds which shaped the rocky formations in the form of a hollow ring. The geological formation of these hills consists primarily of sedimentary outcrops (shallow marine sedimentary facies) and also of the Andean spurs located North and South of the city. The sedimentary sequence has been mapped with appropriate notes on directions and dips of the strata, faults and dykes and the interpreting geological events. The lithology of rock and other features such as oxidation, fracturing and mineralization have been recorded. Quartzites, shales and sandstones from the Cretaceous and Lower Cretaceous have been reported.

Dykes have outcrops of trachytic andesite, dacite and rhyodacite. One of the faults in the dykes runs north to south, another east to west, in the sedimentary rocks.

Mining
Peru has been a leading silver-producing nation (since 2008, the production was 3680 t). Silver from a newly discovered vein in Morro Solar, reported to be of high grade, is to be extracted at the Morococha mines by the Pan American Silver Corporation. According to the explorations already carried out in 2008, the Morro Solar area is reported to have silver resources of 53 million ounces (Moz). Further exploration under the Morococha Exploration programme was in progress, covering a silver-bearing vein with a continuous length of 2.5 km along a strike.

History
During the War of the Pacific, Morro Solar was the scene of one of the bloodiest battles, the Battle of San Juan and Chorrillos. Historical remains of uniforms and weapons have been found here and several forts were built in the vicinity. There are now monuments to the fighters; prominent among them is the "Monument to the Unknown Soldier". The new wild potato species, S. neoweberbaueri, collected by Augusto Weberbauer on Morro Solar, was named by Ludwig Wittmack in 1914.

Landmarks
A war monument erected on the mountain is dedicated to the "Unknown Soldier". Bronze plaques on the sides of the base along the path leading to the site are set in low reliefs which give the allegorical narration of the history of the heroic defense of Peruvian soldiers against Chilean attack in the battles of San Juan and Miraflores. Another monument stands to Miguel Iglesias, the national hero of Peru.

Museo Planetario y Observatorio del Morro Solar, a museum, planetarium and Peru's first astronomical observation center, is located on Morro Solar. It was built and run by the engineer Victor Estremadoyro, after land was donated in 1951. Since 2010, it has had a digital projection system, making it one of the most modern in the country. The museum has exhibits of modern and antique telescopes, meteorological models and pictures, civil rocketry artifacts, along with a variety of items found in the Morro from the Battle of San Juan and Chorrillos. There are also archaeological relics such as aerolites (recovered from Morro Solar) and vestiges of the pre-Inca Ichma culture, fossils of marine fauna, and samples of geological activity related to Morro's rock layers.

Near to the planetarium rises a large illuminated cross, which was built with what had been pylons. It was designed as a welcome gesture for the visit of Pope John Paul II to Peru. The cross lights up at night and can be seen from long distances. Next to the cross, stands a shrine to the Virgin Mary, which is visited by faithful Catholics. A new statue of the "Christ of the Pacific" was proposed to be installed in Lima and there was controversy as to its chosen location which was earlier approved. According to the controversy raised by the Mayor of Lima, the statue would interfere with the scenic view of the Morro Solar, a heritage monument, and hence should be shifted to some other location. The statue was formally consecrated by Cardina Juan Luis Cipriani on the top of Morro Solar in 2011 when Pope Benedict XVI sent a message of greetings and blessings to the people of Peru. The statue contains 26 lights of different colours that are illuminated at night.

Utilities
The hills surrounding the Morro Solar contain antennas which rebroadcast TV channels and some radio stations in Lima. The transmitting station was installed with a NEC transmitter of 400W with one seg signal with live content provided by America TV.

References

Headlands of Peru
Landforms of Lima Region
Cultural heritage of Peru